Andinichthyidae is a prehistoric family of catfishes from the Cretaceous to Eocene of South America.

Species
The four species in four monotypic genera are:
 Genus Andinichthys Gayet, 1988.
 Andinichthys bolivianensis Gayet, 1988.
 Genus Hoffstetterichthys Gayet, 1990.
 Hoffstetterichthys pucai Gayet, 1990.
 Genus Incaichthys Gayet, 1990.
 Incaichthys suarezi Gayet, 1990.
 Genus Yuskaichthys Bogan, Agnolin & Scanferla, 2018.
 Yuskaichthys eocenicus Bogan, Agnolin & Scanferla, 2018.

References

Cretaceous first appearances
Eocene extinctions
Cretaceous bony fish
Prehistoric ray-finned fish families
Prehistoric fish of South America
Catfish of South America
Catfish families